This is a list of invisible artworks; that is, works of art that cannot be seen and, in many cases, touched.

Invisible artworks

See also 
 Conceptual art
 No Show Museum
 The Emperor's New Clothes

References 

Invisible artworks
Invisible artworks